The  was the eighth season of the Japan Football League, the third tier of the Japanese football league system.

Overview

It was contested by 18 teams, and Honda FC won the championship.

Before the season two corporate clubs changed their names and were re-established as independent organizations. Denso SC became FC Kariya and FC Horikoshi became Arte Takasaki.

FC Ryukyu, JEF Reserves and Rosso Kumamoto were promoted from Regional leagues by the virtue of their placing in the Regional League promotion series, thus expanding the league to 18 teams.

At the J. League meeting in August, Rosso Kumamoto were approved as first J. League associate members, becoming eligible to J2 promotion. No such promotion took place because they failed to achieve at least 4th spot in the final standings.

Table

Results

Top scorers

Attendance

Promotion and relegation
Due to the merger of Sagawa Express teams into one club, the Regional League promotion series winners TDK SC were promoted automatically. FC Gifu were set to play Honda Lock in the promotion and relegation series.

F.C. Gifu won the series at 8–1 aggregate score and earned promotion to JFL. Honda Lock were relegated to Kyushu regional league.

References

2006
3